Cameron Smith (born March 26, 1997) is a former American football linebacker who played in the National Football League (NFL). He played college football at   USC and was selected by the Minnesota Vikings in the fifth round of the 2019 NFL Draft.

Early years
Cameron Smith attended Granite Bay High School in Granite Bay, California. He played Linebacker; Granite Bay High won the state championship during Smith’s sophomore year, in which Smith was the leading tackler for the season. He also was on Granite Bay’s baseball and wrestling teams. Smith was rated by Rivals.com as a four-star recruit and was ranked as the seventh best Inside Linebacker in his class and 190th best player overall. He committed to the University of Southern California (USC) to play college football where he joined the Beta-Sigma chapter of Tau Kappa Epsilon fraternity.

College career

Statistics

Source:

Professional career

Smith was drafted by the Minnesota Vikings in the fifth round (162nd overall) of the 2019 NFL Draft. He was waived on August 31, 2019, and was signed to the practice squad the next day. He was promoted to the active roster on October 12, 2019. He was waived again on November 2, 2019, and re-signed to the practice squad. He was promoted back to the active roster on November 26, 2019.

Smith was placed on the reserve/COVID-19 list by the Vikings on July 29, 2020. On August 8, Smith announced he would need open-heart surgery to fix a bicuspid aortic valve he was born with, and would miss the 2020 season. He was activated from the reserve/COVID-19 list on August 10 and was subsequently waived with a non-football illness designation. He reverted to the team's reserve/non-football illness list after clearing waivers the next day. He announced his retirement on August 18, 2021.

References

External links
 USC Trojans bio

1997 births
Living people
American football linebackers
People from Granite Bay, California
Players of American football from California
Sportspeople from Roseville, California
USC Trojans football players
Minnesota Vikings players
Ed Block Courage Award recipients